A Million Machines is an electronic music band from Silver Lake, California. Its members include producer/multi-instrumentalist MIG (The New Room), and vocalist Fate Fatal (The Deep Eynde / Bomp! Records, Kittens for Christian / Sony Records).

Fusing low-res electronic noise and pop hooks, A Million Machines began as a one-off band during a gallery opening in Downtown Los Angeles at LA Art Walk.  After being showcased on local college radio stations including KXLU in Los Angeles, the band's sound quickly progressed to incorporate various areas of electronic music; electroclash, shoegazing, electropunk and electropop.

MIG's ten-year experience with his band The New Room brings heavy influences from Wire, Kraftwerk and the Martin Dupont. Fate Fatal's twenty years with gothic band, THE DEEP EYNDE has given him the experience to deliver gritty and delivers vocal styles that channel 80/90's influences of Dave Gahan (Depeche Mode), and Trent Reznor (Nine Inch Nails). 
 
Their full-length debut album is scheduled for release in Summer 2015 on Vext Records, Los Angeles.

References

External links

 Facebook

Musical groups established in 2013
American experimental musical groups
American synth-pop groups
Electroclash groups
Electronic music groups from California
Musical groups from Los Angeles
Silver Lake, Los Angeles
2013 establishments in California